Lake Calabay is a manmade dredged freshwater lake in the residential community of Hunter's Creek, Florida, just inside the south border of Orange County, Florida.  This lake was a somewhat swampy area prior to its construction about 1993. It was built as a feature for the Hunter's Creek development. Three different gated neighborhoods were built around Lake Calabay. To the east and north is Calabay Cove, with 104 homes constructed from 1993 to 1998. On the west is Montara, with twenty-four homes built between 1994 and 1996. On the south is Ashton, with thirty-four homes built between 1996 and 1997.

Lake Calabay is of irregular shape, constructed that way so as many homes as possible could border the lake. In three places on the south and west the lake borders Hunter's Creek Boulevard. This roadway serves as a form of dam separating Lake Calabay from two bodies of water on the south and west sides of the lake.

There are no swimming areas or boat ramps on Lake Calabay, public or private, and no swimming or boating is allowed. This is a private lake, although the public could reach the shores at three points along Hunter's Creek Boulevard. Also, Calabay Park is located on the east side of the Ashton neighborhood. It borders the lake, but is meant for the use of Hunter's Creek residents and not the general public.

References

Calabay
Calabay